Denis Trottier (born June 8, 1952 in Dolbeau-Mistassini, Quebec) is a Quebec politician and teacher. He was previously a Member of National Assembly of Quebec for the riding of Roberval in the Saguenay-Lac-Saint-Jean region, losing to Premier Philippe Couillard in the 2014 general election. He represented the Parti Québécois.

Trottier went to Université Laval where he received a bachelor's degree in political science and a certificate in college education. He also did a master's degree in regional studies at the Université du Québec à Chicoutimi. Trottier was a lecturer at the UQAC in sociology for 23 years and a teacher at CEGEP de Saint-Félicien in political science and sociology for 18 years. He was also a member of the MRC Maria-Chapdelaine and the mayor of Péribonka from 2001 to 2005. He was also a member of the Fédération Québécoise des Municipalités.

Trottier was elected in the 2007 elections by defeating Liberal incumbent Karl Blackburn.

External links
 
 PQ webpage 

1952 births
French Quebecers
Living people
Mayors of places in Quebec
Parti Québécois MNAs
Université Laval alumni
Université du Québec à Chicoutimi alumni
People from Dolbeau-Mistassini
21st-century Canadian politicians